Bains may refer to:

Places
Bains, Haute-Loire, a commune in France
Bains, Louisiana, US, an unincorporated area in West Feliciana Parish

People with the surname Bains
Hardial Bains (1939–1997), founder of the Communist Party of Canada
Harry Bains (born 1951/2), Canadian politician
Jazzy B (born 1975), Indian Punjabi singer and actor
Naiktha Bains (born 1997), Australian tennis player
Navdeep Bains (born 1977), Canadian politician
Rikki Bains (born 1988), English footballer
Sat Bains (born 1971), English restaurateur
Surjit Bindrakhia (Surjit Singh Bains, 1962–2003), Indian Punjabi singer

Other
Bain's Cape Mountain Whisky

See also 
Les-bains (disambiguation)
Bain (disambiguation)
Baine (disambiguation)
Baines, a surname 
Banes (disambiguation)